Vinod Chamoli is an Indian politician from Uttarakhand and a two term Mayor of  Dehradun Municipal Corporation from 3 May 2008 – 3 May 2018. Chamoli represents the Dharampur (Uttarakhand Assembly constituency). Chamoli is a member of the Bharatiya Janata Party. He defeated three-time Congress MLA Dinesh Agarwal. Vinod Chamoli won 2022 assembly election and is 2 time and current MLA from Dharampur seat.

Elections contested

Uttarakhand Legislative Assembly

Dehradun Municipal Corporation

References 

People from Dehradun district
Bharatiya Janata Party politicians from Uttarakhand
Mayors of Dehradun
Members of the Uttarakhand Legislative Assembly
Living people
Uttarakhand MLAs 2017–2022
Uttarakhand MLAs 2022–2027
1961 births